Rachel Rose (born September 20, 1970) is a Canadian/American poet, essayist and short story writer. She has published three collections of poetry, Giving My Body to Science, Notes on Arrival and Departure, and Song and Spectacle. Her poems, essays and short stories have been published in literary magazines and anthologies in Canada and the United States.

In 2011, Rose and composer Leslie Uyeda were commissioned by the Queer Arts Festival in Vancouver to write the libretto for Canada's first lesbian opera, When The Sun Comes Out, which premiered in August 2013 in Vancouver and in Toronto in June 2014.

Rose was Vancouver's Poet Laureate from 2014 to 2017.

Rose's short story collection The Octopus has Three Hearts was nominated for the 2021 Giller Prize.

Personal life
Rose grew up on Hornby Island (British Columbia), Vancouver, Anacortes and Seattle. In the mid-1990s, she lived and worked in Japan for a year. She has worked as a medical secretary, ESL teacher, and as the poetry mentor in the Writer's Studio at Simon Fraser University. In 2015 she was a resident in the International Writing Program at the University of Iowa.

Bibliography

Poetry
Giving My Body to Science (1999), McGill-Queen's University Press
Notes on Arrival and Departure (2005), McClelland & Stewart
Song and Spectacle (2012), Harbour Publishing
Marry & Burn (2015), Harbour Publishing

Essays
"Creating Benjamin", Prairie Fire, Volume 22, No. 4 (Winter 2001)
"Letters to a Young Mother Who Writes" (in Double Lives: Writing and Motherhood, edited by Shannon Cowan, Fiona Tinwei Lam and Cathy Stonehouse, 2008, McGill/Queens University Press)
"A Tale of Two Mommies" (in Between Interruptions: 30 Women Tell the Truth about Motherhood, edited by Cori Howard, 2009, Key Porter Books)

Short stories
"Sundays" (in Hot & Bothered, edited by Aren X. Tulchinsky, 1998, Arsenal Pulp Press)
"Want", This Magazine, May/June 1999
"The Glass Eye", The Alaska Quarterly Review, Vol 24, No. 3&4 (Fall and Winter 2007)

Anthologies
Uncharted Lines: Poems from the Journal of the American Medical Association (1998), Ten Speed Press
In Fine Form: The Canadian Book of Form Poetry (2005), Polestar
White Ink: Poems on Mothers and Motherhood (2007), York University
Letters to the World: Poems from the Wom-po Listserv (2008), Red Hen Press
Open Wide A Wilderness: Canadian Nature Poems (2009), Wilfrid Laurier University Press

Operas
When The Sun Comes Out (2013)

Books 
 The Dog Lover Unit: Lessons in Courage from the World's K-9 Cops (2017), St Martin's Press
 The Octopus has Three Hearts (2021), Douglas & McIntyre

Awards and prizes

References

External links
Rachel Rose personal website
Official site of Vancouver's Poet Laureate

1970 births
21st-century Canadian poets
Living people
Canadian lesbian writers
Canadian women poets
Writers from Vancouver
Canadian LGBT poets
Canadian women short story writers
Canadian women essayists
21st-century Canadian women writers
20th-century Canadian poets
20th-century Canadian women writers
20th-century Canadian short story writers
21st-century Canadian short story writers
International Writing Program alumni
20th-century Canadian essayists
21st-century Canadian essayists
Poets Laureate of places in Canada
21st-century Canadian LGBT people
20th-century Canadian LGBT people